Kiowa  or Cáuijògà/Cáuijò:gyà ("language of the Cáuigù (Kiowa)") is a Tanoan language spoken by the Kiowa Tribe of Oklahoma in primarily Caddo, Kiowa, and Comanche counties. The Kiowa tribal center is located in Carnegie. Like most North American indigenous languages, Kiowa is an endangered language.

Origins 
Although Kiowa is most closely related to the other Tanoan languages of the Pueblos, the earliest historic location of its speakers is western Montana around 1700. Prior to the historic record, oral histories, archaeology, and linguistics suggest that pre-Kiowa was the northernmost dialect of Proto-Kiowa-Tanoan, spoken at Late Basketmaker II Era sites. Around AD 450, they migrated northward through the territory of the Ancestral Puebloans and Great Basin, occupying the eastern Fremont culture region of the Colorado Plateau until sometime before 1300. Speakers then drifted northward to the northwestern Plains, arriving no later than the mid-16th century in the Yellowstone area where the Kiowa were first encountered by Europeans. The Kiowa then later migrated to the Black Hills and the southern Plains, where the language was recorded in historic times.

Demographics 

Colorado College anthropologist Laurel Watkins noted in 1984 based on Parker McKenzie's estimates that only about 400 people (mostly over the age of 50) could speak Kiowa and that only rarely were children learning the language. A more recent figure from McKenzie is 300 adult speakers of "varying degrees of fluency" reported by Mithun (1999) out of a 12,242 Kiowa tribal membership (US Census 2000).

The Intertribal Wordpath Society, a nonprofit group dedicated to preserving native languages of Oklahoma, estimates the maximum number of fluent Kiowa speakers as of 2006 to be 400. A 2013 newspaper article estimated 100 fluent speakers. UNESCO classifies Kiowa as 'severely endangered.' It claims the language had only 20 mother-tongue speakers in 2007, along with 80 second language speakers, most of whom were between the ages of 45 and 60.

Revitalization efforts
The University of Tulsa, the University of Oklahoma in Norman, and the University of Science and Arts of Oklahoma in Chickasha offer Kiowa language classes.

Kiowa hymns are sung at Mount Scott Kiowa United Methodist Church.

Starting in the 2010's the Kiowa Tribe offered weekly language classes at the Jacobson House, a nonprofit Native American art center in Norman, Oklahoma. Dane Poolaw and Carol Williams taught the language using Parker McKenzie's method.

Alecia Gonzales (Kiowa/Apache, 1926–2011), who taught at USAO, wrote a Kiowa teaching grammar called : beginning Kiowa language. Modina Toppah Water (Kiowa) edited Saynday Kiowa Indian Children’s Stories, a Kiowa language book of trickster stories published in 2013.

In 2022, Tulsa Public Schools signed an agreement with the Kiowa Tribe of Oklahoma to teach Kiowa language and culture in the district.

Phonology 

There are 23 consonants:

Kiowa distinguishes six vowel qualities, with three distinctive levels of height and a front-back contrast. All six vowels may be long or short, oral or nasal. Four of the vowels occur as diphthongs with a high front off-glide of the form vowel + .

There are 24 vowels:

{| class="wikitable"
|+ Monophthongs
! rowspan="2" colspan="2" |  
! align="center" colspan="2" | Front
! align="center" colspan="2" | Back
|-
! align="center" | short
! align="center" | long
! align="center" | short
! align="center" | long
|-
! rowspan="2" | Close
! oral
| align="center" | 
| align="center" | 
| align="center" | 
| align="center" | 
|-
! nasal
| align="center" | 
| align="center" | 
| align="center" | 
| align="center" | 
|-
!rowspan="2" | Mid
! oral
| align="center" | 
| align="center" | 
| align="center" | 
| align="center" | 
|-
! nasal
| align="center" | 
| align="center" | 
| align="center" | 
| align="center" | 
|-
! rowspan="2" | Open
! oral
| align="center" | 
| align="center" | 
| align="center" | 
| align="center" | 
|-
! nasal
| align="center" | 
| align="center" | 
| align="center" | 
| align="center" | 
|}

Contrasts among the consonants are easily demonstrated with an abundance of minimal and near-minimal pairs. There is no contrast between the presence of an initial glottal stop and its absence.

The ejective and aspirated stops are articulated forcefully. The unaspirated voiceless stops are tense, while the voiced stops are lax.

The voiceless alveolar fricative  is pronounced  before 

It occurs seldom in word-initial position.

All consonants may begin a syllable but  may not occur word-initially outside of loan-words ( 'lion').

Certain sequences of consonant and vowel do not occur: dental and alveolar obstruents preceding  (*); velars and  preceding  (*).  These sequences do occur if they are the result of contraction:   'then he got up'

Americano).

Nasalization of voiced stops operates automatically only within the domain of the pronominal prefixes: voiced stops become the corresponding nasals either preceding or following a nasal.

Underlying  surfaces in alternating forms as  following velars, as  following labials and as  if accompanied by falling tone.

Obstruents are devoiced in two environments: in syllable-final position and following a voiceless obstruent. Voiced stops are devoiced in syllable-final position without exception.

Orthography 

Kiowa orthography was developed by native speaker Parker McKenzie, who had worked with J. P. Harrington and later with other linguists. The development of the orthography is detailed in Meadows & McKenzie (2001). The tables below show each orthographic symbol used in the Kiowa writing system and its corresponding phonetic value (written IPA).

{| class="wikitable" style="text-align: center;"
|+ Vowels
! Orthography !! Pronunciation
! Orthography !! Pronunciation
|-
| a || 
| ai || 
|-
| au || 
| aui || 
|-
| e || 
| colspan="2" rowspan="2" |
|-
| i || 
|-
| o || 
| oi || 
|-
| u || 
| ui || 
|}

The mid-back vowel  is indicated by a digraph . The four diphthongs indicate the offglide  with the letter  following the main vowel. Nasal vowels are indicated by underlining the vowel letter: nasal o is thus . Long vowels are indicated with macron diacritics: long o is thus . Short vowels are unmarked. Tone is indicated with diacritics. Since long vowels also have tones, the vowel symbols can have both a macron and a tone diacritic above the macron:  (long high),  (long low),  (long falling).

{| class="wikitable" style="text-align: center;"
|+ Consonants
! Orthography !! Pronunciation
! Orthography !! Pronunciation
|-
| b || 
| ch || 
|-
| f || 
| x || 
|-
| p || 
| s || 
|-
| v || 
| z || 
|-
| d || 
| l || 
|-
| j || 
| y || 
|-
| t || 
| w || 
|-
| th || 
| h || 
|-
| g || 
| m || 
|-
| c || 
| n || 
|-
| k || 
| colspan="2" rowspan="2" |
|-
| q || 
|}

The palatal glide  that is pronounced after velar consonants  (which are phonetically , respectively) is not normally written. The glottal stop  is also not written as it is often deleted and its presence is predictable. A final convention is that pronominal prefixes are written as separate words instead of being attached to verbs.

Like many scripts of India, such as Devanagari, the Kiowa alphabet is ordered according to mostly phonetic principles. The alphabetical order is shown in the tables above: Vowels first, then consonants, reading down the columns, left column then right.

Morphology

Nouns

Number inflection 

Kiowa, like other Tanoan languages, is characterized by an inverse number system. Kiowa has four noun classes. Class I nouns are inherently singular/dual, Class II nouns are inherently dual/plural, Class III nouns are inherently dual, and Class IV nouns are mass or noncount nouns. If the number of a noun is different from its class's inherent value, the noun takes the suffix -gau (or a variant).

Mithun (1999:445) gives as an example chē̲̂ "horse/two horses" (Class I) made plural with the addition of -gau: chē̲̂gau "horses". On the other hand, the Class II noun tṓ̲sè "bones/two bones" is made singular by suffixing -gau: tṓ̲sègau "bone."

Verbs 

Kiowa verbs consist of verb stems that can be preceded by prefixes, followed by suffixes, and incorporate other lexical stems into the verb complex. Kiowa verbs have a complex active–stative pronominal system expressed via prefixes, which can be followed by incorporated nouns, verbs, or adverbs. Following the main verb stem are suffixes that indicate tense/aspect and mode. A final group of suffixes that pertain to clausal relations can follow the tense-aspect-modal suffixes. These syntactic suffixes include relativizers, subordinating conjunctions, and switch-reference indicators. A skeletal representation of the Kiowa verb structure can be represented as the following:

{| style="text-align: center; line-height: 1.1em;" cellpadding="3"
! pronominalprefix
! -
| incorporated elements(adverb + noun + verb)
! -
! VERB STEM
! -
! tense/aspect-modalsuffixes
! -
! syntacticsuffixes
|}

The pronominal prefixes and tense/aspect-modal suffixes are inflectional and required to be present on every verb.

Pronominal inflection 

Kiowa verb stems are inflected with prefixes that indicate:

 grammatical person
 grammatical number
 semantic roles of animate participants

All these of the categories are indicated for only the primary animate participant. If there is also a second participant (such as in transitive sentences), the number of the second participant is also indicated. A participant is primary in the following cases:

 A volitional agent participant (i.e. the doer of the action who also has control over the action) is primary if it is the only participant in the clause.
 In two-participant volitional agent/non-agent clauses:
 The non-agent participant is primary when
 the non-agent is not in the first person singular or third person singular AND
 the volitional agent is singular
 The volitional agent participant is primary when
 the non-agent is in the first person singular or third person singular AND
 the volitional agent is non-singular

The term non-agent here refers to semantic roles including involitional agents, patients, beneficiaries, recipients, experiencers, and possessors.

{| class="wikitable" style="text-align: center;"
|+ Intransitive verbs
!
! colspan="3" | Number
|-
! Person !! Singular !! Dual !! Plural
|-
! 1st
| à-
| style="background-color: lightGrey;" |  || è-
|-
! 2nd
| èm- || mà- || bà-
|-
! 3rd
| – || è̲- || á-
|-
! Inverse
| colspan="3" | è-
|}

Notes

Bibliography 
 Adger, David and Daniel Harbour. (2005). The syntax and syncretisms of the person-case constraint. In K. Hiraiwa & J. Sabbagh (Eds.), MIT working papers in linguistics (No. 50).
 Campbell, Lyle. (1997). American Indian languages: The historical linguistics of Native America. New York: Oxford University Press. .
 
 Gonzales, Alecia Keahbone. (2001). Thaum khoiye tdoen gyah: Beginning Kiowa language. Chickasha, OK: University of Science and Arts of Oklahoma Foundation. .
 
 Harbour, Daniel. (2003). The Kiowa case for feature insertion.
 Harrington, John P. (1928). Vocabulary of the Kiowa language. Bureau of American Ethnology bulletin (No. 84). Washington, D.C.: U.S. Govt. Print. Off.
 
 
 McKenzie, Andrew. (2012). The role of contextual restriction in reference-tracking. Ph.D. thesis, University of Massachusetts Amherst. http://scholarworks.umass.edu/dissertations/AAI3518260. 
 McKenzie, Parker; & Harrington, John P. (1948). Popular account of the Kiowa Indian language. Santa Fe: University of New Mexico Press.
 
 Merrill, William; Hansson, Marian; Greene, Candace; & Reuss, Frederick. (1997). A guide to the Kiowa collections at the Smithsonian Institution. Smithsonian Contributions to Anthropology 40.
 
 
 
 Mithun, Marianne. (1999). The languages of Native NorthMarianne Mithun America. Cambridge: Cambridge University Press.  (hbk); .
 Palmer, Jr., Gus (Pánthâidè). (2004). Telling stories the Kiowa way.
 
 Takahashi, Junichi. (1984). Case marking in Kiowa. CUNY. (Doctoral dissertation).
 
 Trager, Edith C. (1960). The Kiowa language: A grammatical study. University of Pennsylvania. (Doctoral dissertation, University of Pennsylvania).
 Trager-Johnson, Edith C. (1972). Kiowa and English pronouns: Contrastive morphosemantics. In L. M. Davis (Ed.), Studies in linguistics, in honor of Raven I. McDavid. University of Alabama Press.
 Watkins, Laurel J. (1976). Position in grammar: Sit, stand, and lie. In Kansas working papers in linguistics (Vol. 1). Lawrence.
 
 
Watkins, Laurel J.; & McKenzie, Parker. (1984). A grammar of Kiowa. Studies in the anthropology of North American Indians. Lincoln: University of Nebraska Press. .

External links 

 The Power of Kiowa Song: A Collaborative Ethnography
 Vocabulary of the Kiowa Language , John P. Harrington, 1928; full book digitized by Google, public domain in the US
 A Grammar of Kiowa: Appendix 3: Orthographies , Laurel J. Watkins, 1984; writing systems for Kiowa

 
Indigenous languages of the North American Plains
Tanoan languages
Languages of the United States
Native American language revitalization
Endangered indigenous languages of the Americas